Tudjmanism or Tuđmanism is a form of Croatian nationalism. Franjo Tuđman defined it as non-Communist nationalism with "re-examined Croatian history". According to Croatian historian Ivo Banac, Tudjmanism unites all forms of the Croatian anti-liberalism, that is Croatian fascism and the Croatian communism. Croatian political scientist Slaven Ravlić defines Tuđmanism to be the name both for an ideology and for a regime. According to Ravlić, the ideology contains elements of deification of the Croatian people started by Ante Starčević, a continuation of the 20th-century conservative tradition that rejects liberal democracy, and a mix of ideas represented by neoconservatism. The resulting regime was authoritarian, it created a form of crony capitalism, and engaged in the creation of an ideological hegemony.

The "re-examination of Croatian history" was based mostly on World War II in Yugoslavia. The realization that establishment of an independent Croatian state would require help of both Croatian nationalists and the Croatian communists, led to the so-called policy of reconciliation, embraced by Tuđman as well as Maks Luburić and later Bruno Bušić.

His political platform included a few simple but important elements: the rejection of communist and fascist Ustasha ideology as a supra-national totalitarian regimes buried by history; bracing of the Croatian diaspora,  but with the awareness that the struggle for sovereign Croatia will be led in the country;  he attempted to make an agreement with the Serbs as the most numerous and influential people in Yugoslavia, and the largest national minority in Croatia, connecting Croatia and Bosnia and Herzegovina as countries geo politically, economically and spatially directed one to another.

In many important traits his views and program remained incomplete: for example, even though it was obvious that totalitarianism is collapsing, it was still uncertain how long the process would take (the same was true for the former Yugoslavia). Tudjman likely took into account both options: staying in some kind of confederal Yugoslavia with a socialist-capitalist hybrid economic system, as well as fully independent Croatian state, with the principles of economic liberalism (privatisation controversy).

The modern Croatian history saw three processes. The first process was the so-called de-titoisation, after which started the tudjmanist era in 1989 and lasted until 2000, after death of Franjo Tuđman and after Ivo Sanader became president of the Croatian Democratic Union (HDZ). During Sanader's presidency the so-called process of detudjmanization started in Croatia and lasted until his resignation from the party. He was succeeded by his deputy, Jadranka Kosor and in May 2012, HDZ elected a new president, Tomislav Karamarko, who announced tudjmanization of the HDZ.

References

Literature

Bosnian War
Croatian Democratic Union
Croatian nationalism
Croatian War of Independence
Eponymous political ideologies
Neoconservatism
Political history of Croatia
Politics of Croatia
Yugoslav Wars
Political terminology of Croatia
Croatian irredentism